CGR may refer to:

 Campo Grande International Airport (IATA airport code)
 Canadian Government Railways
 Cape Government Railways
 Center for Governmental Research
 Ceylon Government Railway
 Chip Ganassi Racing
 Classic Game Room
 Commercial gramophone record – see Spelling of disc
 Condensate to Gas Ratio
 Contraloría General de la República de Costa Rica
 Cyprus Government Railway